Scalopidiidae is a family of crustaceans belonging to the order Decapoda.

Genera:
 Caenopedia P.K.L.Ng & Castro, 2013
 Scalopidia Stimpson, 1858

References

Decapods
Decapod families